Dieudonné is a French name meaning "Gift of God", and thus similar to the Greek-derived  Theodore or the Spanish Diosdado. It may refer to:

People

Given name
 Dieudonné Cédor (1925–2010), Haitian painter
 Dieudonné Costes (1892–1973), French aviator
 Dieudonné Disi (born 1980), Rwandan long-distance and cross county runner
 Dieudonne Dolassem (born 1979), Cameroonian judoka
 Dieudonné Sylvain Guy Tancrède de Dolomieu or Déodat Gratet de Dolomieu (1750–1801), French geologist
 Dieudonné Ganga (born c. 1946), Congolese politician and diplomat
 Dieudonné Gnammankou, Beninean historian
 Dieudonné de Gozon ( 1346–53), French knight
 Dieudonné-Félix Godefroid or Félix Godefroid (1818–1897), Belgian harpist
 Dieudonné Jamar (1878 – after 1905), Belgian racing cyclist
 Dieudonné Kabongo (1950–2011), Congolese-born Belgian humorist and actor
 Dieudonné Kalilulika (born 1981), Congolese football player
 Dieudonné Kayembe Mbandakulu (born 1945), Congolese military chief
 Dieudonné Kwizera (born 1967), Burundian middle-distance runner
 Dieudonné LaMothe (born 1954), Haitian long-distance runner
 Dieudonné Londo (born 1976), Gabonese football player
 Louis XIV of France (1638–1715), King of France, born Louis-Dieudonné
 Dieudonné M'bala M'bala (born 1966), French comedian and political activist, convicted for hate speech and slander
 Dieumerci Mbokani (born 1985), Congolese football player, born Dieudonné Mbokani
 Dieudonné Minoungou (born 1981), Burkinabè football player
 Dieudonné Mondjo, Gabonese politician
 Dieudonné Owona (born 1986), Cameroonian football player
 Dieudonné Saive (1889–1973), Belgian small arms designer
 Dieudonné Yarga (born 1986), Burkinabè football player
 Dieudonné Yougbaré (1917–2011), Burkinabé Roman Catholic bishop

Surname
 Adolf Dieudonné (1864–1944), German physician and hygienist
 Albert Dieudonné (1889–1976), French actor and film director
 Frédéric Dieudonné (born 1969), French writer and film-maker
 Georges Oltramare (1896–1960), Swiss author and fascist politician who used the pseudonym Charles Dieudonné
 Henri Charles Ferdinand Marie Dieudonné or Henri, Count of Chambord (1820–1883), disputedly King of France
 Jean Dieudonné (1906–1992), French mathematician
 Nabatingue Tokomon Dieudonné or Nabatingue Toko (born 1952), Chadian football player
 Pierre Dieudonné (born 1947), Belgian auto racing driver and journalist

Nickname
 Philip II of France (1165–1223), King of France, also known as Dieudonné

Other uses
 Dieudonné, Oise, a commune in northern France

See also
 Deusdedit (disambiguation), meaning "God has given", the name of several ecclesiastical figures

Theophoric names
French masculine given names
French-language surnames